PS Vinothraj (born 18 June 1988) is a Tamil film director and screenwriter. He wrote and directed the critically-acclaimed Tamil film, Pebbles (Koozhangal) which is also his debut film. Pebbles was screened at the 50th International Film Festival Rotterdam held in Netherlands on 4 February 2021, where it received the Tiger Award at the festival. It was selected as the Indian entry for the Best International Feature Film at the 94th Academy Awards, but was not nominated.

Early life 
PS Vinothraj was born on 18 June 1988 in Madurai, Tamil Nadu. Vinothraj's father, Palani, died when Vinothraj was nine. He had to drop out of school and work in the flower markets of Madurai as a daily wage labourer carrying heavy bundles of flowers. He went to Tiruppur at the age of 14 to work there in one of the town's textile factories. He joined a tutorial college and studied there for a couple of years. Eventually, seeing his fellow co-workers have their lives destroyed, he decided to leave the place at the age of 19 and go to Chennai and work in cinema.

Film career 
Vinothraj was fascinated with cinema after seeing a film shooting when he was a child. In Chennai he got a job as an employee at a DVD shop. He worked there for five years and during that time he used to talk to various film directors and assistant directors and others working in cinema. He watched a lot of films, especially foreign films. He doesn't understand English and so he could not understand the subtitles in foreign language films. Eventually, he started watching visually-striking films that he could understand without subtitles.

He got work as an assistant director in some short films in the Nalaiya Iyakkunar TV Program using the contacts he got from working in the DVD shop. Later, he met A. Sarkunam, the Tamil film director whose films include Kalavani and Vaagai Sooda Vaa. He then went on to work as an assistant director in the Tamil feature film Manjapai (2013), directed by Raghavan and produced by Sarkunam. After working in that film, he felt he needed to learn more and so, he joined the post-modernistic theatre troupe Manal Magudi and worked there as an assistant director for two years.

Vinothraj made a short film, Subway, at this time on a shoe-string budget. The idea for Pebbles was based on what his sister told him about her treatment by her husband. Her family could not pay a dowry, so her husband threw her out and she had to walk almost 13 kilometres to her mother's house. The film was produced by Learn and Teach Productions. Vinothraj, along with his team, shot the film in around 37 days in the peak hours of sunlight during the noon as he wanted to capture the heat of the landscape.

Filmography

Awards and honours

External links 
 Pebbles - IMDb

References 

Tamil film directors
1988 births
Living people